The Chasseral Ouest is a prominence west of the Chasseral, in the Jura Mountains. It is located on the border between the Swiss cantons of Neuchâtel and Bern. The Chasseral Ouest reaches an elevation of 1,552 metres above sea level and is the highest point of the canton of Neuchâtel.

The summit is easily accessible to hikers and is located near the Chasseral Pass road (1,502 m).

References

External links

Chasseral Ouest on Hikr

Mountains of the Jura
Mountains of Switzerland
Mountains of the canton of Bern
Mountains of the canton of Neuchâtel
Highest points of Swiss cantons
Bern–Neuchâtel border
One-thousanders of Switzerland